The canton of Château-Renault is an administrative division of the Indre-et-Loire department, central France. Its borders were modified at the French canton reorganisation which came into effect in March 2015. Its seat is in Château-Renault.

It consists of the following communes:
 
Autrèche
Auzouer-en-Touraine
Beaumont-Louestault
Le Boulay
Bueil-en-Touraine
Cerelles
Charentilly
Château-Renault
Chemillé-sur-Dême
Crotelles
Dame-Marie-les-Bois
Épeigné-sur-Dême
La Ferrière
Les Hermites
Marray
Monthodon
Morand
Neuillé-Pont-Pierre
Neuville-sur-Brenne
Neuvy-le-Roi
Nouzilly
Pernay
Rouziers-de-Touraine
Saint-Antoine-du-Rocher
Saint-Aubin-le-Dépeint
Saint-Christophe-sur-le-Nais
Saint-Laurent-en-Gâtines
Saint-Nicolas-des-Motets
Saint-Paterne-Racan
Saint-Roch
Saunay
Semblançay
Sonzay
Villebourg
Villedômer

References

Cantons of Indre-et-Loire